Crepis pannonica, the pasture hawksbeard, is a European species of flowering plant in the family Asteraceae. It is native to eastern Europe (Austria, Czech Republic, Hungary, Romania, Ukraine, Russia, etc.) and the Caucasus, as well as being sparingly naturalized in the State of Connecticut in the northeastern  United States.

Crepis pannonica  is a perennial herb up to 130 cm (52 inches) tall. One plant can produce as many as 8 flower heads, each with as many as 90 yellow ray florets.

References

External links
Czech Botany, Crepis pannonica (Jacq.) K. Koch – škarda panonská / škarda panónska in Czech with photos
Free Nature Images photos
Plantarium, Русскоязычные названия Скерда венгерская Изображения, Crepis pannonica (Jacq.) K. Koch Описание таксона in Russian with photos
Botanik im Bild, Flora von Österreich photos with captions in German
photo of herbarium specimen at Missouri Botanical Garden

pannonica
Flora of Europe
Flora of the Caucasus
Plants described in 1796